Athuman Saidi Minshehe Janguo (born December 5, 1936) is a Tanzanian politician. He is a member of both the National Assembly of Tanzania and the African Union's Pan-African Parliament. In the Tanzanian parliament, his constituency is Kisarawe and he is a member of the Parliamentary Privileges, Ethics and Powers Committee. Janguo is a former Director General of the Tanzania Harbours Authority.

References

 Janguo's page at the Parliament of Tanzania website
 Parliament team now split: It’s over corruption claims by Ndesamburo

1936 births
Living people
Members of the Pan-African Parliament from Tanzania
Members of the National Assembly (Tanzania)